Puquio District is one of twenty-one districts of the Lucanas Province in Peru.

Geography 
Other mountains are listed below:

Some of the largest lakes of the district are Apiñaqucha, Islaqucha, Pukaqucha and Urqunqucha.

References